"All I Need Is Your Sweet Lovin'" (also known under the title "All I Need Is Your Good Lovin'") is a song by American singer Gloria Gaynor, released in August 1975. It was written by Bobby Flax and Larry Lambert, and the single charted at number forty-four on the UK Singles Chart.

Credits and personnel
 Gloria Gaynor - lead vocal
 Bobby Flax - writer
 Larry Lambert - writer
 Jay Ellis - producer
 Meco Monardo - producer
 Tony Bongiovi - producer
 Lou Del Gato - arranger
 Chappel & Co. Ltd - publisher

Charts

Marika Gombitová version

"Včielka" is a cover version of the Gloria Gaynor song, recorded by Slovak female singer Marika Gombitová. Her version, with featuring alternate lyrics, was released on Diskotéka OPUSu 5 compilation by OPUS in 1980.

Credits and personnel
 Marika Gombitová - lead vocal
 Bobby Flax - writer
 Larry Lambert  - writer
 Peter Guldan - lyrics
 V.V. Systém - orchestra

References

General

Specific

1975 singles
1975 songs
Gloria Gaynor songs
Marika Gombitová songs
Song recordings produced by Tony Bongiovi